Dorian Bevec is a German molecular biologist, Chief Scientific Officer and co-founder at Mondobiotech. He was born on May 21, 1957, in Zagreb, FPR Yugoslavia.

Education
 1980 B.Sc. in general biology, Justus-Liebig-University, Giessen, Germany
 1983 M.Sc. in biology, Justus-Liebig-University, Giessen, Germany
 1984 Visiting Scientist at the Basel Institute for Immunology, Lab. Michael Steinmetz, Basel, Switzerland
 1983–1985 Scientist at the Institute of Virology, Justus-Liebig-University, Giessen, Germany
 1985–1988 Scientist at the Laboratory for Molecular Biology of the Ludwig Maximilian University of Munich, Germany
 1988–1989 Post-doctoral Research Fellow at Sandoz Research Institute, Vienna, Austria
 1989 Ph.D. in biology, Ludwig Maximilians-University, Munich, Germany

Scientific  career
From 1989 to 1990 he was laboratory head at  the Department of Immunopharmacology at Sandoz Research Institute, Vienna, Austria, and, after a year as visiting scientist at the Memorial Sloan-Kettering Cancer Center, Laboratory Head, Department of Anti-Retroviral Therapy at Sandoz. In 1996, he became Head of the Molecular Biology Group there. In 1997 he received the Dr. habil. in human virology from the  University of Vienna. He then joined Novartis Research Institute as Programme Team Head, Department of Immunology, and, in 1999, became Group Leader and Vice President, Research & Head of Platform Technologies at Axxima Pharmaceuticals AG, Martinsried, Germany; in 2001 he co-founded  Mondobiotech  Group, Stans, Switzerland, where he took the position  of  Chief Scientific Officer.

References

External links
 Mondobiotech
 Justus-Liebig-University Giessen
 Ludwig-Maximilians-University Munich 
 University of Vienna

1957 births
Living people
20th-century German people
20th-century biologists
21st-century biologists
Croatian biologists
German molecular biologists
German people of Croatian descent
Scientists from Zagreb